Susan Estrada is in the Internet Hall of Fame for founding CERFnet, one of the original regional IP networks, in 1988. Through her leadership and collaboration with PSINet and UUnet, Estrada helped form the interconnection enabling the first commercial Internet traffic via the Commercial Internet Exchange.

She wrote Connecting to the Internet in 1993 and she was inducted to the Internet Hall of Fame in 2014.

She is on the board of trustees of the Internet Society.

In 2012, Susana Estrada was inducted into the Internet Hall of Fame as a pioneer in the development of internet.

References

Living people
Internet pioneers
American telecommunications industry businesspeople
Year of birth missing (living people)
Women Internet pioneers